Erla Ásgeirsdóttir (born January 27, 1994 in Reykjavík, Iceland) is an alpine skier from Iceland. She competed for Iceland at the 2014 Winter Olympics in slalom and giant slalom at the alpine skiing events.

References

Living people
Erla Asgeirsdottir
Alpine skiers at the 2014 Winter Olympics
Erla Asgeirsdottir
Erla Asgeirsdottir
1994 births
21st-century Icelandic women